The 1946 Nebraska gubernatorial election was held on November 5, 1946, and featured former school superintendent and newspaper publisher Val Peterson, a Republican, defeating Democratic nominee, state Senator Frank Sorrell.

Democratic primary

Candidates
Samuel K. Howard, laundry route supervisor
Frank Sorrell, member of the Nebraska Legislature

Results

Republican primary

Candidates
William R. Brooks, salt company manager
William E. Johnson, former Lieutenant Governor
Val Peterson, administrative assistant and secretary to Governor Dwight Griswold
A. E. Swanson, retired farmer and stockman
George J. Thomas, candy distributor
A. B. Walker, physician
Arthur J. Weaver Jr., Lincoln city councilman and son of former Governor Arthur J. Weaver
Joseph Wishart, attorney and farmer

Results

General election

Results

References

Gubernatorial
1946
Nebraska
November 1946 events in the United States